The Brunswick Boat Group, headquartered in Knoxville, Tennessee, United States, is the largest maker of pleasure boats in the world. The company's net sales were US$1.7 billion in 2008, and US$1.0 billion in 2012. The Boat Group makes Sea Ray, Bayliner and Meridian pleasure boats; Boston Whaler offshore fishing boats; and Crestliner, Cypress Cay, Harris (formerly FloteBote), Lowe, Lund, Princecraft fishing, deck and pontoon boats. Brunswick is one of the largest boat makers by units in Europe, with Quicksilver, Uttern and Valiant boat brands. Brunswick also owns the New Zealand boat brand, Rayglass. Brunswick markets its specialty boats through Brunswick Commercial and Government Products. Attwood and Kellogg boat parts and accessories, once a part of the group, are now a part of the Mercury Marine group.

History
The Brunswick Boat Group (BBG) was formed in 2000 to manage the Brunswick Corporation's nearly 45 boat brands. The parent company is traded on the New York Stock Exchange under the symbol BC.  From 2000 to 2005 the BBG doubled in size and acquired 13 additional brands.

The global economic downturn led the Brunswick Boat Group to close more than a dozen plants and reduce its workforce by about 10% after its sales fell more than 16% in 2008.

Subsidiaries
Current subsidiaries include:

Former subsidiaries:

Notes:

See also
 Brunswick Bowling & Billiards, Lake Forest, Illinois
 Life Fitness Division, Schiller Park, Illinois
 Mercury Marine, Fond du Lac, Wisconsin

References

External links 
 Brunswick Boat Group